In linguistics, clusivity is a grammatical distinction between inclusive and exclusive first-person pronouns and verbal morphology, also called inclusive "we" and exclusive "we". Inclusive "we" specifically includes the addressee (that is, one of the words for "we" means "you and I and possibly others"), while exclusive "we" specifically excludes the addressee (that is, another word for "we" means "he/she/they and I, but not you"), regardless of who else may be involved. While imagining that this sort of distinction could be made in other persons (particularly the second) is straightforward, in fact the existence of second-person clusivity (you vs. you and them) in natural languages is controversial and not well attested. While clusivity is not a feature of standard English language, it is found in many languages around the world.

The first published description of the inclusive-exclusive distinction by a European linguist was in a description of languages of Peru in 1560 by Domingo de Santo Tomás in his Grammatica o arte de la lengua general de los indios de los Reynos del Perú, published in Valladolid, Spain.

Schematic paradigm

Clusivity paradigms may be summarized as a two-by-two grid:

Morphology
In some languages, the three first-person pronouns appear to be unrelated. That is the case for Chechen, which has singular so/со, exclusive txo/тхо, and inclusive vay/вай. In others, however, all three are related, as in Tok Pisin, an English creole spoken in Papua New Guinea, which has singular mi, exclusive mi-pela, and inclusive yu-mi (a compound of mi with yu "you") or yu-mi-pela. However, when only one of the plural pronouns is related to the singular, that may be the case for either one. In some dialects of Mandarin Chinese, for example, inclusive or exclusive 我們／我们 wǒmen is the plural form of singular wǒ "I", and inclusive 咱們／咱们 zánmen is a separate root. However, in Hadza, the inclusive, ’one-be’e,  is the plural of the singular ’ono (’one-) "I", and the exclusive, ’oo-be’e, is a separate  root.

It is not uncommon for two separate words for "I" to pluralize into derived words, which have a clusivity distinction. For example, in Vietnamese, the familiar word for "I" (ta) pluralizes to inclusive we (chúng ta), and the formal or cold word for "I" (tôi) pluralizes into exclusive we (chúng tôi).  In Samoan, the singular form of the exclusive is the regular word for "I", and the singular form of the inclusive may also occur on its own and then also means "I" but with a connotation of appealing or asking for indulgence.

In the Kunama language of Eritrea, the first-person inclusive and exclusive distinction is marked on dual and plural forms of verbs, independent pronouns, and possessive pronouns.

Distinction in verbs
Where verbs are inflected for person, as in the native languages of Australia and in many Native American languages, the inclusive-exclusive distinction can be made there as well. For example, in Passamaquoddy, "I/we have it" is expressed
Singular n-tíhin (first person prefix n-)
Exclusive n-tíhin-èn (first person n- + plural suffix -èn)
Inclusive k-tíhin-èn (inclusive prefix k- + plural -èn)

In Tamil, on the other hand, the two different pronouns have the same agreement in the verb.

First-person clusivity
First-person clusivity is a common feature among Dravidian, Kartvelian, and Caucasian languages, Australian and Austronesian languages, and is also found in languages of eastern, southern, and southwestern Asia, Americas, and in some creole languages. Some African languages also make the distinction, such as the Fula language. No European language outside the Caucasus makes this distinction grammatically, but some constructions may be semantically inclusive or exclusive.

Singular inclusive forms
Several Polynesian languages, such as Samoan and Tongan, have clusivity with overt dual and plural suffixes in their pronouns. The lack of a suffix indicates the singular. The exclusive form is used in the singular as the normal word for "I", but the inclusive also occurs in the singular. The distinction is one of discourse: the singular inclusive has been described as the "modesty I" in Tongan. It is often rendered in English as one, but in Samoan, its use has been described as indicating emotional involvement on the part of the speaker.

Second-person clusivity

In theory, clusivity of the second person should be a possible distinction, but its existence is controversial.  Some notable linguists, such as Bernard Comrie, have attested that the distinction is extant in spoken natural languages, while others, such as John Henderson, maintain that the human brain does not have the capacity to make a clusivity distinction in the second person.  Many other linguists take the more neutral position that it could exist but is nonetheless not currently attested.

Clusivity in the second person is conceptually simple but nonetheless if it exists is extremely rare, unlike clusivity in the first.  Hypothetical second-person clusivity would be the distinction between "you and you (and you and you ... all present)" and "you and someone else whom I am not addressing currently."  These are often referred to in the literature as "2+2" and "2+3", respectively (the numbers referring to second and third person as appropriate).  Horst J. Simon provides a deep analysis of second-person clusivity in his 2005 article.  He concludes that oft-repeated rumors regarding the existence of second-person clusivity—or indeed, any [+3] pronoun feature beyond simple exclusive we – are ill-founded, and based on erroneous analysis of the data.

Distribution of the clusivity distinction

The inclusive–exclusive distinction occurs nearly universally among the Austronesian languages and the languages of northern Australia, but rarely in the nearby Papuan languages. (Tok Pisin, an English-Melanesian creole, generally has the inclusive–exclusive distinction, but this varies with the speaker's language background.) It is widespread in India, featuring in the Dravidian and Munda languages, as well as in several Indo-European languages of India such as Oriya, Marathi, Rajasthani, Punjabi, Sindhi, and Gujarati (which either borrowed it from Dravidian or retained it as a substratum while Dravidian was displaced). It can also be found in the languages of eastern Siberia, such as Tungusic, as well as northern Mandarin Chinese. In indigenous languages of the Americas, it is found in about half the languages, with no clear geographic or genealogical pattern. It is also found in a few languages of the Caucasus and Sub-Saharan Africa, such as Fulani, and Khoekhoe.

It is, of course, possible in any language to express the idea of clusivity semantically, and many languages provide common forms that clarify the ambiguity of their first person pronoun (English "the rest of us", Italian noialtri). A language with a true clusivity distinction, however, does not provide a first-person plural with indefinite clusivity in which the clusivity of the pronoun is ambiguous; rather, speakers are forced to specify by the choice of pronoun or inflection, whether they are including the addressee or not. That rules out most European languages, for example. Clusivity is nonetheless a very common language feature overall. Some languages with more than one plural number make the clusivity distinction only in, for example, the dual but not in the greater plural, but other languages make it in all numbers. In the table below, the plural forms are the ones preferentially listed.

References

Further reading
 Jim Chen, First Person Plural (analyzing the significance of inclusive and exclusive we in constitutional interpretation)
 
 Filimonova, Elena (eds). (2005). Clusivity: Typological and case studies of the inclusive-exclusive distinction. Amsterdam: John Benjamins Publishing Company. .
 Kibort, Anna. "Person." Grammatical Features. 7 January 2008.  Retrieved on 16 March 2020.

Personal pronouns
Grammatical conjugation
Grammatical categories

pl:Osoba (językoznawstwo)#Inkluzywność i ekskluzywność 1. osoby l. mn.